The Prime Minister of Nigeria was a political office in Nigeria. The Prime minister was the head of government in the country from 1960 to 1966, when the office was replaced by the president of Nigeria holding this role.

History of the office
When Nigeria gained independence from the United Kingdom on 1 October 1960, it originally had a parliamentary constitutional monarchy with Queen Elizabeth II as the head of state.

But in 1963, Nigeria ended its status as a Commonwealth Realm and became a republic. The head of state was the president, while the prime minister served as the head of government. In 1966, the office of prime minister was abolished (as the inaugural holder of the office, Abubakar Tafawa Balewa, had been assassinated) and since then, Nigeria has been a presidential republic with the president as the head of state and head of government.

Prime Minister of Nigeria (1960–1966)

See also
 List of Governors-General of Nigeria
 List of heads of state of Nigeria

References

 
Heads of Govt